Frederic Archer (16 June 1838 – 22 October 1901) was a British composer, conductor and organist, born in Oxford, Oxfordshire, England. He studied music in London and Leipzig, and held musical positions in England and Scotland until 1880, when he became organist of Plymouth Church in Brooklyn, New York.

Archer was later appointed conductor of the Boston, Massachusetts Oratorio Society, director of Carnegie Music Hall in Pittsburgh, Pennsylvania, and in 1899 organist of the Church of the Ascension in Pittsburgh. In 1896, he established the Pittsburgh Symphony Orchestra. In 1885, he founded The Keynote, which for a time he edited, and also published several books and numerous organ compositions.

Death
Archer died of cancer at his home in Pittsburgh on 22 October 1901, aged 63. He, his wife, and daughter rest in apparently unmarked graves at Pittsburgh's Homewood Cemetery.

References

Bibliography

1838 births
1901 deaths
English composers
English conductors (music)
British male conductors (music)
English organists
British male organists
Musicians from Pittsburgh
Burials at Homewood Cemetery
19th-century English musicians
Deaths from cancer in Pennsylvania
19th-century organists